Gordon Forbes (born  1959) is a Canadian former competitive figure skater. He is the 1979 Nebelhorn Trophy champion, the 1979 Prague Skate champion, and a six-time Canadian national medallist (silver in 1980, bronze in 1979, 1981, 1983–85). He finished 9th at the 1984 World Championships in Ottawa and 17th at the 1985 World Championships in Tokyo. He is originally from Brockville and represented the Minto Skating Club. As of 2016, he works as a coach at the same club.

Competitive highlights

References 

1950s births
Canadian male single skaters
Living people
Sportspeople from Brockville
20th-century Canadian people
21st-century Canadian people